Lars Marten (born 23 March 1984) is a German former footballer who played as a defender.

Career
Marten made his professional debut in the 3. Liga for Wuppertaler SV on 6 December 2008, starting in the away match against Erzgebirge Aue, which finished as a 0–1 loss.

References

External links
 Profile at DFB.de
 Profile at kicker.de

1984 births
Living people
People from Lüdenscheid
Sportspeople from Arnsberg (region)
Footballers from North Rhine-Westphalia
German footballers
Association football defenders
VfL Bochum II players
Wuppertaler SV players
SC Fortuna Köln players
3. Liga players
Regionalliga players